Philippe Riboud (born 9 April 1957) is a French fencer. He won two golds, two silvers and two bronze medals at three Olympic Games. He was vice-president of the French Fencing Federation after the Olympic Games of 1988.

References

External links
 

1957 births
Living people
French male épée fencers
Olympic fencers of France
Fencers at the 1976 Summer Olympics
Fencers at the 1980 Summer Olympics
Fencers at the 1984 Summer Olympics
Fencers at the 1988 Summer Olympics
Olympic gold medalists for France
Olympic silver medalists for France
Olympic bronze medalists for France
Olympic medalists in fencing
Sportspeople from Lyon
Medalists at the 1980 Summer Olympics
Medalists at the 1984 Summer Olympics
Medalists at the 1988 Summer Olympics
Universiade medalists in fencing
Universiade gold medalists for France
Medalists at the 1977 Summer Universiade
20th-century French people
21st-century French people